BigBigLove is the debut studio album by Australian indie rock band Little Birdy, released in Australia on 4 October 2004. It reached number 5 in the ARIA music charts and was certified gold less than a month after its release. The album was produced by Paul McKercher at Big Jesus Burger Studios and mixed at Studios 301.

Three singles were released from the album; "Beautiful to Me", which reached number 27, "Tonight's the Night", and "Excited", which reached number 44 on the ARIA Singles Charts.

The album was nominated for four ARIA Awards in 2004; Best Breakthrough Artist/Album, Best Rock Album, Best Producer, and Best Engineer. Two tracks from the album reached the Triple J Hottest 100 for 2004; "Beautiful to Me" at number 8 and "Tonight's the Night" at number 78.

The album features a more pop-oriented, commercial alternative rock sound than their later records, which experimented with electronic music and folk.

Background

McKercher was selected to produce after Steele was impressed with his work on Augie March's debut album, Sunset Studies.

Track listing

Charts

Certifications

References 

2004 debut albums
Little Birdy albums